Leptomantis harrissoni, common name Harrisson's flying frog or brown tree frog,  is a species of frog in the family Rhacophoridae. It is endemic to northern Borneo.

Distribution
This species is widely distributed in northern Borneo and occurs in Sarawak and Sabah (Malaysia), Brunei, and northern Kalimantan (Indonesia).

Habitat
Its natural habitat is primary or old secondary lowland rainforests in both flat and hilly terrain below 350 m of elevation. It is threatened by habitat loss.

Description
These medium-sized frogs have an angular and pointed snout and well developed dark hand webbing. They are basically brown.

The basic color is dark brown.

Biology
Leptomantis harrissoni spends most of its life high up in the forest. Males call for breeding in water-containing holes located in the trunks of trees. Eggs are laid in a foam nest attached to the bark above said tree holes.

These frogs use the skin membranes between their fingers as a kind of parachute to make real flights among the branches of trees of the forest (hence the common name of the species).

References 

harrissoni
Endemic fauna of Borneo
Amphibians of Brunei
Amphibians of Indonesia
Amphibians of Malaysia
Taxa named by Robert F. Inger
Amphibians described in 1959
Taxobox binomials not recognized by IUCN
Taxonomy articles created by Polbot
Amphibians of Borneo